Caesetius is a genus of spiders in the family Zodariidae. It was first described in 1893 by Simon. , it contains 10 species from southern Africa.

Species
Caesetius comprises the following species:
Caesetius bevisi (Hewitt, 1916) – South Africa
Caesetius biprocessiger (Lawrence, 1952) – South Africa
Caesetius flavoplagiatus Simon, 1910 – Namibia, South Africa
Caesetius globicoxis (Lawrence, 1942) – South Africa
Caesetius inflatus Jocqué, 1991 – Mozambique, Malawi, South Africa
Caesetius murinus Simon, 1893 – South Africa
Caesetius politus (Simon, 1893) – South Africa
Caesetius rosei (Bacelar, 1953) – Mozambique
Caesetius schultzei Simon, 1910 – South Africa
Caesetius spenceri (Pocock, 1900) – South Africa

References

Zodariidae
Araneomorphae genera
Spiders of Africa